Me and My Moulton is a 2014 Canadian-Norwegian animated short film written and directed by Torill Kove. It premiered at the 2014 Annecy International Animated Film Festival on 10 June 2014. It was nominated for the Academy Award for Best Animated Short Film at the 87th Academy Awards.  Me and My Moulton won the Golden Sheaf Award for Best  Animation at the 2015 Yorkton Film Festival.

Plot
Me and My Moulton is a humorous autobiographical short film based on Kove's experiences as a 7-year-old girl in Norway, one of three sisters who long for a bicycle. The film explores the emotions of Kove's character, who is often embarrassed by their unorthodox architect parents.

Kove was quoted in a Toronto Star article as saying the story had been on her mind for years and that her goal was to convey a girl’s conflicting feelings about her parents: "These feelings are not easy for kids. It’s confusing when you don’t have all the insights that you get later in life to realize your parents embarrass you but at the same time you really love them. There are mixed emotions."

Critical reception
The Academy Award nomination was the third for Kove, who was also nominated for My Grandmother Ironed the King's Shirts and her Oscar-winning The Danish Poet, and the 73rd nomination for the National Film Board of Canada. In March 2015, the film was named Best Animated Short at the 3rd Canadian Screen Awards.

References

External links

Me and My Moulton at the National Film Board of Canada

Today, My Short Film Was Nominated For an Oscar, filmmaker's blog, The Huffington Post

2014 films
2014 drama films
2010s animated short films
National Film Board of Canada animated short films
Films directed by Torill Kove
Films set in Norway
Norwegian animated short films
Biographical films about children
Best Animated Short Film Genie and Canadian Screen Award winners
2010s English-language films
2010s Canadian films